Justin Purll is an Australian rugby union player for USA Perpignan in the Top 14.

Career
From 2001 until 2009, he played in Italy for Calvisano, where he played 27 games in the Heineken Cup, making him an experienced statesmen for the club. With Calvisano experiencing financial problems, he left the club to join Cavalieri Prato in 2009. After playing one season and making 18 appearances for the club, he headed to France to join Union Bordeaux Bègles in the Pro D2. Now he plays in USA Perpignan.

References

Living people
1979 births
Australian rugby union players
Rugby union locks
USA Perpignan players
Rugby union players from New South Wales